Megatoma is a genus of beetle native to the Palearctic (including Europe), the Near East and the Nearctic.

Species include:

 Megatoma ampla (Casey, 1900)
 Megatoma angularis (Mannerheim, 1853)
 Megatoma belfragei LeConte, 1874
 Megatoma conspersa Solsky, 1876
 Megatoma cylindrica Kirby, 1837
 Megatoma dolia Beal, 1967
 Megatoma electra Zhantiev, 2006
 Megatoma falsa Horn, 1875
 Megatoma friebi Pic, 1938
 Megatoma giffardi Blaisdell, 1927
 Megatoma graeseri Reitter, 1887
 Megatoma indica Háva, 2000
 Megatoma kaliki Beal, 1967
 Megatoma leucochlidon Beal, 1967
 Megatoma perversa Fall, 1926
 Megatoma polia Beal, 1967
 Megatoma pubescens Zetterstedt, 1828
 Megatoma riedeli Mroczkowski, 1967
 Megatoma ruficornis Aubé, 1866
 Megatoma tianschanica Sokolov, 1972
 Megatoma trichorhopalum Beal, 1967
 Megatoma trogodermoides Beal, 1967
 Megatoma undata Linnaeus, 1758
 Megatoma variegata Horn, 1875

References

Dermestidae genera